Memecylon parvifolium is a species of plant in the family Melastomataceae. It is endemic to Sri Lanka.

Leaves
Broadly obovate, base tapering, obtuse to rounded apex, veins invisible; dark green, shiny above; young flush reddish.

Trunk
Bark - gray, finely cracked; Wood - yellow, hard, heavy; twigs quadrangular.

Flowers
White to pinkish red, few, small, nearly sessile.

Fruits
Black berry, tipped with calyx.

Ecology
Montane forest subcanopy.

References

External links

 http://www.theplantlist.org/tpl1.1/record/ifn-77723
 http://cabdirect.org/abstracts/20093323585.html;jsessionid=72958E6E0398B3FD0CC334D82C23479D
 http://indiabiodiversity.org/species/show/250989

parvifolium
Endemic flora of Sri Lanka